St. Urbain's Horseman is the seventh novel by Canadian author Mordecai Richler. First published in 1971 by McClelland & Stewart, it won the Governor General's Award for 1971.

Plot and setting
The novel is set in London and Montreal during the late 1960s. The protagonist, Jake Hersh, first appeared in Richler's fourth novel, The Apprenticeship of Duddy Kravitz, as a schoolmate of the title character. Now, almost twenty years later, Hersh is a moderately successful film director, married with three children, who has become embroiled in a sordid sex scandal. With his world crumbling around him, Jake continues to be obsessed with the mystery of his long-lost cousin and idol Joey, an adventurer, Nazi-hunter and Spanish Civil War veteran.

Translations
This novel has been translated into Spanish, by Manuel Bartolomé López, from the Weidenfeld and Nicolson edition, as El jinete de san Urbano (Barcelona/Buenos Aires/Mexico City: Best Sellers Grijalbo, 1975, 1st edition in Spanish).

References

  

New Canadian Library
1971 Canadian novels
Novels by Mordecai Richler
Novels set in London
Novels set in Montreal
Fiction set in the 1960s
Governor General's Award-winning fiction books
Novels set in Quebec